Michael Garber  (May 10, 1892 – January 20, 1977) was a Montreal-based lawyer and a Canadian Jewish community activist. He was a founder of the Canadian Jewish Congress, and succeeded Samuel Bronfman as president for two terms, from 1962 to 1968, after having chaired its national executive for a number of years. He was also a president of the Zionist Organization of Canada, wrote a column for the Canadian Jewish Chronicle, and contributed to the Yiddish newspaper Der Keneder Adler.

References

Lawyers from Montreal
Jews from Quebec
Canadian Jewish Congress
1977 deaths
1892 births
Activists from Montreal